Maurice Sutton Jr. (born July 31, 1989) is an American professional basketball player for Mahram Tehran BC of the Iranian Basketball Super League. He played college basketball for Villanova University and then carved out a career in Latin America.

High school career
Sutton attended Largo High School in Largo, Maryland. As a senior, he averaged 18 points, 13 rebounds and nine blocks per game in 2007–08.

College career
Sutton attended Villanova University in 2008–09, but did not play and chose to redshirt the season as to maintain his four seasons of eligibility.

In his freshman season at Villanova University, Sutton played sparingly for the Wildcats. In 26 games, he averaged 1.8 points, 2.3 rebounds and 1.0 blocks in 10.3 minutes per game.

In his sophomore season, his production increased slightly but he still had a similar bench role to his freshman season. In 27 games, he averaged 2.4 points 2.3 rebounds and 1.0 blocks in 10.6 minutes per game.

In his junior season, he became a regular rotation player over the final six weeks of the season. In 25 games (7 starts), he averaged 3.6 points and 3.1 rebounds in 13.7 minutes per game.

In his senior season, he finished his career with 100 blocks, which ranks 11th all-time at Villanova. In 31 games (10 starts), he averaged 3.2 points and 2.7 rebounds in 9.5 minutes per game.

Professional career
Between 2013 and 2015, Sutton played in the NBA Development League for the Tulsa 66ers and then the renamed Oklahoma City Blue. In 91 regular season games over two D-League season, Sutton averaged 7.9 points, 5.9 rebounds and 1.2 blocks per game. He also had three NBA Summer League stints with the Washington Wizards (2013), Oklahoma City Thunder (2014), and the D-League Select Team (2015).

Since 2015, Sutton has played mostly in Latin America—apart from a stint in Poland with Śląsk Wrocław to start the 2015–16 season—splitting his time in the Dominican Republic, Venezuela and Mexico. He spent the 2017–18 and 2018–19 seasons in the Mexican LNBP with Aguacateros de Michoacán, and then started the 2019–20 season with Abejas de León, but was released on October 14, 2019. In November 2019, he played for Dosa in the XXVI Torneo de Baloncesto Superior.

On March 6, 2020, Sutton signed with Iranian team Mahram Tehran BC.

Personal
Sutton is the son of Maurice Sr. and Gwen Sutton, and has two older siblings, Terry Barnes and Candace Sutton-Pearson. His cousin is former NBA player, Chris Gatling.

References

External links
NBA D-League profile
Villanova bio

1989 births
Living people
Abejas de León players
Aguacateros de Michoacán players
American expatriate basketball people in Mexico
American expatriate basketball people in Poland
American expatriate basketball people in the Dominican Republic
American expatriate basketball people in Venezuela
American expatriate basketball people in Iran
American men's basketball players
Basketball players from Maryland
Centers (basketball)
Cocodrilos de Caracas players
Oklahoma City Blue players
People from Largo, Maryland
Power forwards (basketball)
Śląsk Wrocław basketball players
Tulsa 66ers players
Villanova Wildcats men's basketball players